Ahli Sidab Club is an Omani sports club based in Darsait, in the Wilayat of Muttrah, Oman. The club is currently playing in Oman First Division League, second division of Oman Football Association. Their home ground is Sultan Qaboos Sports Complex, but they also recognize the older Royal Oman Police Stadium as their home ground. Both stadiums are government owned, but they also own their own personal stadium and sports equipment, as well as their own training facilities.

History
Ahli Sidab Club was founded on 18 April 2004 after merging the two locals clubs, Al-Ahli and Sidab.

Being a multisport club
Although being mainly known for their football, Ahli Sidab Club like many other clubs in Oman, have not only football in their list, but also hockey, volleyball, handball, basketball, badminton and squash. They also have various youth football teams competing in Oman Olympic League, Oman Youth League (U-19) and Oman Youth League (U-17).

Honours and achievements

National titles
Omani League (1): 
Winners 1981–82
Runners-up 1983–84
Sultan Qaboos Cup (5): 
Winners 1972, 1982, 1983, 1984, 1988
Runners-up 1995, 1998
Oman First Division League (1): 
Winners 2009-10

Honours and achievements (Other Sports)
Hockey
Sultan Qaboos Cup (7): 
Winners 1957, 1985, 1990, 1995, 1998, 2002, 2005

Handball

Current squad
Squad for the 2022–23 season

Left Backs
33  Hasan Madan

References

External links
Ahli Sidab Club – SOCCERWAY
Ahli Sidab Club – GOALZZ.com
Ahli Sidab Club – KOOORA
Ahli Sidab Club – ofa.om

2004 establishments in Oman
Association football clubs established in 2004
Football clubs in Oman
Sports clubs in Muscat, Oman